Adam Rowe (born 11 January 1992) is an English stand-up comedian and podcaster from Liverpool.

Early life
Rowe was brought up in Dovecot and West Derby areas of Liverpool, England. Rowe started a maths degree at the University of Liverpool but did not complete it in order to concentrate on performing comedy.

Career
Rowe was named Liverpool's Hot Water Comedy Club's Comedian of the Year in 2011.

Rowe's 2018 Edinburgh Festival Fringe show Undeniable was described as "saying something vital and fresh" and "structured, consistently funny and well-crafted routine." Rowe won funniest joke at the Edinburgh Fringe Festival that year with the joke "Working at the Jobcentre has to be a tense job - knowing that if you get fired, you still have to come in the next day."

Rowe's 2019 Edinburgh show was called Pinnacle and was described as "another irrepressible and articulate hour by a rising talent".

Rowe has appeared on BBC Radio 5 Live show Fighting Talk, The News Quiz, on the award-winning Liverpool-based podcast The Anfield Wrap, and on Roast Battle.

Have A Word Podcast 
Rowe has his own podcast Have A Word with fellow comedian Dan Nightingale. In 2021, Rowe and Nightingale, under the umbrella of Have A Word, released the song Laura's Gone in a bid to reach Christmas number 1 and raise money for Zoë's Place Baby Hospice and the Childhood Eye Cancer Trust. The song reached number 39 in the Official Charts Company midweek chart.

In 2022, Have A Word won the Best Podcast at the Chortle Awards. In 2023, it was nominated for the Best Comedy Podcast at the National Comedy Awards.

As of 18 February 2023, Have A Word is the 19th most subscribed to page on Patreon.

Awards

Personal life
Rowe is a fan of football club Liverpool F.C.

References

External links 
 Official Website of Adam Rowe

Living people
Comedians from Liverpool
Year of birth missing (living people)